Crooked River is a special service area in the Canadian province of Saskatchewan.

Demographics 

References 

Bjorkdale No. 426, Saskatchewan
Designated places in Saskatchewan
Special service areas in Saskatchewan
Division No. 14, Saskatchewan